The 2021 San Diego Open was a men's tennis tournament played on outdoor hard courts. It was the 1st edition of the San Diego Open, and part of the ATP Tour 250 series of the 2021 ATP Tour.

It was primarily organized due to the cancellation of Asian tournaments during the 2021 season, because of the ongoing COVID-19 pandemic. 
 
Positioned one week before the 1000 Indian Wells Masters and only a 2-hour 30 min drive from Indian Wells, the San Diego Open attracted a very strong line up of players including Denis Shapovalov, Andrey Rublev, Grigor Dimitrov and Andy Murray.  With 8 of the top 20 players attending and the ranking cut off being 42 to get into the main draw it was the second most competitive ATP 250 all season since Doha.

It was held at the Barnes Tennis Center in San Diego, United States, from September 27 until October 3, 2021.
 
Daniel Vallverdu took on the position of managing director, Ryan Redondo was named the tournament director and Billie Jean King accepted the role of honorary tournament chair.

After beating Dimitrov in the Semi Final Casper Ruud went on to win the final of the 2021 San Diego Open beating Cameron Norrie 6-0 6-2 and was handed the trophy by Rod Laver. It was Ruud's fifth victory of the Season.

Champions

Singles 

  Casper Ruud def.  Cameron Norrie, 6–0, 6–2

Doubles 

  Joe Salisbury /  Neal Skupski def.  John Peers /  Filip Polášek, 7–6(7–2), 3–6, [10–5]

Singles main-draw entrants

Seeds

1 Rankings are as of 20 September 2021.

Other entrants
The following players received wildcards into the main draw:
  Andy Murray
  Brandon Nakashima
  Kei Nishikori

The following player received entry as a special exempt:
  Kwon Soon-woo

The following players received entry from the qualifying draw:
  Alex Bolt 
  Salvatore Caruso 
  Christopher Eubanks 
  Federico Gaio

The following players received entry as lucky losers:
  Kevin Anderson
  August Holmgren
  Denis Kudla

Withdrawals
Before the tournament
  Félix Auger-Aliassime → replaced by  August Holmgren
  Cristian Garín → replaced by  Dominik Koepfer
  David Goffin → replaced by  Sebastian Korda
  Kwon Soon-woo → replaced by  Kevin Anderson
  Dušan Lajović → replaced by  Lloyd Harris
  Kei Nishikori → replaced by  Denis Kudla
  Reilly Opelka → replaced by  Federico Delbonis

Doubles main-draw entrants

Seeds

1 Rankings are as of 20 September 2021.

Other entrants
The following pairs received wildcards into the doubles main draw:
  Brandon Nakashima /  Sem Verbeek 
  Antonio Šančić /  Artem Sitak

Withdrawals
Before the tournament
  Nicholas Monroe /  Frances Tiafoe → replaced by  Dominik Koepfer /  Nicholas Monroe
  Rajeev Ram /  Jack Sock → replaced by  Jordan Thompson /  Jackson Withrow

References

External links
 Official website 

2021 ATP Tour
Tennis tournaments in the United States
September 2021 sports events in the United States
October 2021 sports events in the United States
2021 in American tennis